The 2015–16 NACAM Formula 4 Championship season was the inaugural season of the NACAM Formula 4 Championship. It began on 1 November 2015 with a non-championship round at the Autódromo Hermanos Rodríguez in Mexico City, and finished on 25 June 2016 at the same venue after seven triple-header rounds.

Teams and drivers

Drivers with an asterisk on their "Rounds" column took part in the non-championship opening round.

Race calendar and results

The calendar was published on 19 July 2015. All rounds were held in Mexico. The initially scheduled first round was held as a non-championship race in support of the Formula One World Championship. An updated version of the calendar was published on 22 November. A more updated version was presented two days later during the official presentation of the first round. In December 2015, the calendar was remade again, this time with seven official dates. It was revised for a fourth time in February 2016, and for a fifth time later in April.

Championship standings

Points were awarded to every classified finisher in each race. Five points were awarded to the driver with the fastest time in qualifying. One point was awarded for fastest lap. The championship followed the same scoring rules as MSA Formula did in 2015.

Drivers' Championship

Rookie Cup

Nations Cup

See also
 Panam GP Series
 LATAM Challenge Series

References

External links
  

NACAM Formula 4 Championship seasons
NACAM
NACAM
NACAM
NACAM
NACAM F4
NACAM F4